2C Compétition is a French rally team based in Thiers, Puy-de-Dôme, France. It is owned by the company SARL 2 C and was founded in 2009.

Competition history
The team were responsible for running the Škoda Fabia R5 cars that propelled Pierre-Louis Loubet and Vincent Landais to WRC2 championship title wins in 2019.

The team entered the World Rally Championship for Manufacturers in 2020 and 2021 using a Hyundai i20 Coupe WRC. WRC regulations at the time insisted the name of the manufacturer had to be included in the name of the team entry, thus the team competed as Hyundai 2C Compétition. It's also likely Hyundai supported the entry as drivers Loubet and Ole Christian Veiby were part of their junior driver programme.

In 2022, the team competed in the American Rally Association national championship with Ken Block driving its Hyundai i20 Coupe WRC. To assist with logistics they opened a base in Indianapolis, Indiana.

In 2023, 2C Compétition partnered with Hyundai to contest as the manufacturer's WRC2 entry using their Hyundai i20 N Rally2 cars. Reports suggested they had ambitions to contest the WRC using Rally1 cars but the decision 'was not in their hands'.

Rally results

WRC results

References

External links
  

2009 establishments in France
Auto racing teams established in 2009
French auto racing teams
World Rally Championship teams